Zimba is a Bantu language of the Democratic Republic of the Congo, spoken in a band of country south of the Elila River. It is not closely related to other languages, unless the divergent dialects Kwange and Mamba (Kyenyemamba) are considered separate languages.

References

Lega-Binja languages
Languages of the Democratic Republic of the Congo